ALR may refer to:

Places
 Agricultural Land Reserve, Canada
 Alexandra Aerodrome, New Zealand
 Alresford railway station (Essex), England

Science
 Augmenter of Liver Regeneration or GFER, a growth factor
 Aldo-keto reductase family 1, member A1, enzyme

Law
 Allgemeines Landrecht, Prussian Civil Code
 American Law Reports

Others
 American Laundromat Records, a label
 American Literary Review, by the University of North Texas
 Art Loss Register, UK, database for stolen art
 Ashover Light Railway, Derbyshire, England
 Advanced Logic Research, a defunct computer company
 Australian Literary Review
 Automated Lip Reading

Slang
Known as Alright